Competition Success Review, often abbreviated as CSR, is a general knowledge magazine in India aimed at students who wish to appear for Union Public Service Commission exams. Its content includes general knowledge with a focus on Indian current events, tips for college interviews, interviews with IAS high-rankers, interview and GD tips and sample question papers for different competitive examinations. It was first published in 1964 as a pull-out supplement.

External links
Official website

1964 establishments in India
Biweekly magazines published in India
English-language magazines published in India
Magazines established in 1964
Student magazines
Magazines published in Delhi
Education magazines